Cruquiuseiland (English: Cruquius Island) is a suburb the Eastern Docklands in the Zeeburg district of Amsterdam. 
The majority of the area is the man-made Cruquius Island itself, although some adjacent land is also part of the area. It is bordered on the north by Borneolaan (between Dirk Vreekenstraat and C. van Eesterenlaan), the west is near bounded by rail, the south by Lozingskanaal and the east by the Rijnkannel.

History 
Cruquius Island was built between 1875 and 1925 originally for the expansion of the Port of Amsterdam. Previous to this the area was a swampy wetlands, which was a popular smuggling route into Amsterdam.

The 19th century saw a movement away from private slaughterhouses, and toward public slaughterhouses. To this end, the Veemarkt (Cattle market) was provisioned in Cruquiuseiland. It was designed by the architects A.C. Boerma and E. Damen, and constructed in 1887. There was a marketplace and stables for cows, calves, horses, sheep and pigs. The area also included municipal customs warehouse, Huisje Insulinde (Office of the NV Oliefabrieken Insulinde, built in 1913, now a brewery) and an abattoir which was expanded in 1919.
Only eight buildings have been preserved, including the homes of the market manager and the weigher, the canteen building with monumental gate and a police station. The buildings are the oldest building of the Eastern Docklands
Subsequently, the majority of the area has been converted into residential buildings, although there are many business premises, particularly to the east and to the southwest side. In the late 80s former warehouses along Zeeburgerkade were converted into 390 premium houses. From 2011 through 2030 the Eastern end of Cruquiuseiland is being transformed from an industrial estate to residential area.

Museums 

Cruquiuseiland hosts the Persmuseum  ("The Press Museum") and the Museum Perron Oost

References

Neighbourhoods of Amsterdam